The 2022–23 Ghanaian FA Cup (also called the MTN FA Cup for sponsorship reasons) is the 43rd edition of the Ghanaian FA Cup, the knockout football competition of Ghana. Accra Hearts of Oak are the defending Champions.

Format 
A total of 110 clubs consisting of 18 Premier League Clubs, 48 Division One League Clubs and 44 Division Two League Clubs from the Regional Football Associations would participate the competition.

The preliminary round stage of the cup would be played between the 48 Division One Clubs and 44 Division Two clubs totalling 92 clubs across the country. The Winners of the preliminary round will progress to the round of 64 where they would be drawn against the 18 Premier League clubs.

The Winner of the MTN FA Cup shall represent Ghana in the 2022–23 CAF Confederation Cup.

Sponsorship 
In June 2021, MTN renewed their sponsorship for the competition for three extra years with 4 million Ghana cedis with focus on the 2022 Ghanaian FA Cup. Star times also is set to contribute $200,000 as part of their full $1,000,000.00 for the entire 2021–22 football season for the second year of the sponsorship deal with the Ghana Football Association.

Preliminary round 
The draw for the preliminary round was made on 18 October 2022 and streamed live on youtube . Only second-tier and third-tier teams joined the round, as the Premier League teams received a bye from the round.

See also
Official website

References

2022 in African sport
2023 in African football
Ghanaian FA Cup